Alexandra Lendon Bastedo (9 March 1946 – 12 January 2014) was a British actress, best known for her role as secret agent Sharron Macready in the 1968 British espionage/science fiction adventure series The Champions. Bastedo was a vegetarian and animal welfare advocate, and wrote a number of books on both subjects.

Early life
Bastedo was born in Hove, England. Her mother (Liberiana Dorina Rescagliova 1917–2001) was of French, German and Italian descent, while her Canadian-born father (Gilbert Lendon Bastedo 1915–1985) was of Spanish, Dutch, Scottish and native American extraction. She attended Brighton and Hove High School and Brighton School of Drama.

Professional career
Bastedo made her film debut as one of the title characters in William Castle's poorly received 13 Frightened Girls (1963). She gained attention on the European continent, earning her the nickname, "La Bastedo". One of her first appearances in popular culture was in the 1966 film Doctor in Clover where she appears as a young nurse dancing with Sir Lancelot at a party (a non-speaking role).

Although most familiar to viewers of 1960s TV as Sharron Macready in The Champions, she was also known for her language skills, speaking Italian, Spanish, French and German. This ability brought her to the attention of 10 Downing Street, where she was employed to assist with translations, and landed her the role of co-presenter of Miss World competitions with Peter Marshall in the 1980s.

In 1979, she played in the series The Aphrodite Inheritance. In 1988, Bastedo was the cover star for Rank, a live album by British band The Smiths that charted at number 2 on the UK Albums Chart. In 1992, she appeared in "Fat" – the second broadcast episode of Absolutely Fabulous, playing a 1960s model associate of Edina and Patsy. She was seen in two episodes of The Saint series, alongside Roger Moore.

In 2006, Bastedo was reunited for the first time with her co-stars from The Champions to provide commentaries and an interview for a DVD release of the show. Still working as an actress, she appeared in Batman Begins, and touring theatres in 2006 with a production of Beyond Reasonable Doubt alongside Leslie Grantham and Simon Ward. In 2008, she joined the cast of EastEnders, playing Cynthia. In January 2008, she appeared as co-presenter (with Ed Stewart) of "The Magic of Mantovani" at Lighthouse, Poole. The success of this concert led, the following year, to a second concert at the same venue, with the Mantovani Orchestra, which she again co-presented.

Personal life
Bastedo dated David Frost and Omar Sharif, but turned down the advances of Steve McQueen who, she recalled, propositioned her with the line, "My wife doesn't understand me". In the case of Sharif, the liaison lasted only a few weeks because of the actor's bridge-playing, his odd hours and the fact that he took telephone numbers from other women.

Mike Tomkies, the Fleet Street journalist who abandoned the life of a celebrity reporter to live alone in the wilderness, lived with her for a while in Canada, and they talked of marriage, but she was prohibited from marrying by a contract for The Champions (1968 to 69). He said that she was the "most stunningly beautiful creature" he had ever seen.

In 1980, at Chichester Cathedral, Bastedo married Patrick Garland, a director, writer and actor; he became a long-serving director of the Chichester Festival Theatre. Bastedo wrote a memoir, Beware Dobermanns, Donkeys and Ducks, as well as several books on caring for cats and dogs. Her husband died on 19 April 2013.

Animal welfare
Bastedo was a vegetarian and the founder of Alexandra Bastedo Champions (ABC) Animal Sanctuary. In an interview for the BBC television series Where Are They Now? Bastedo provided a glimpse into her private life. She used to be the president of her local RSPCA branch but gave up her position in 2008, to dedicate more time to her fast-growing animal sanctuary at her home in West Chiltington, West Sussex. A journalist who interviewed her husband in 2010 described their domestic surroundings:

She was also a patron to a number of animal welfare organisations including Compassion in World Farming, Wildlife Aid Foundation, National Animal Welfare Trust, Greyhounds in Need and Naturewatch.

Death
Bastedo died of breast cancer on 12 January 2014, aged 67, in a hospital in Worthing, England. She was buried next to her husband Patrick Garland at St Mary's Church, Sullington, West Sussex. The service was conducted by her local vicar and friend, Revd Derek Spencer, who had overseen the funeral of her husband Patrick less than one year earlier.

Bibliography
 Alexandra Bastedo, Beware Dobermanns, Donkeys and Ducks (Parkwest: Robson Books, 1998) 
 Alexandra Bastedo and Jeannie Kemnitzer, Canine Care and Cuisine: The Healthy Dog Book (Parkwest: Robson Books, 2000) 
 Alexandra Bastedo and Jeannie Kemnitzer, The Healthy Cat Book: Feline Care and Cuisine (Parkwest: Robson Books, 2000)

Filmography
 13 Frightened Girls (aka The Candy Web) (1963) – Alex 
 The Liquidator (1965) – Radio Operator (uncredited)
 Doctor in Clover (1966) – Nurse at Party (uncredited)
 That Riviera Touch (1966) – Girl at Roulette Table
 Casino Royale (1967) – Meg
 Wedding Night (1970) – Gloria – Girl Friend
 My Lover, My Son (1970) – Cicely Clarkson
 This, That and the Other (1970) – Angie
 The Kashmiri Run (1970) - Henrietta Fleming
 The Blood Spattered Bride (1972) – Mircalla Karstein
 I Hate My Body (1974) – Leda Schmidt
 The Ghoul (1975) – Angela
 El Clan de los Nazarenos (1975) – Arima
 Tu dios y mi infierno (1976) – Liselotte
 Find the Lady (1976) – Victoria
 The Man Inside (1976, TV movie) – Joan Lytton
 La Gioconda está triste (1977)
 El Mirón (1977) – Elena – wife
 Cabo de vara (1978) - Lola
 Stigma (1980) – Anna
 A Choice of Two (1981) 
 Draw! (1984, TV movie) – Bess, Harry's Girlfriend in Bell City / member of acting troupe
 La veritat oculta (1987) – Agnes / Chiromancer
 The Byzantine Cat (2002) - Barbara
 Batman Begins (2005) – Gotham Society Dame

Television
 The Count of Monte Cristo (TV series, 1964) – Renée de Saint-Méran
 The Scales of Justice (episode The Haunted Man, 1966) – Laura
 The Wednesday Play (1966) (TV) – The Girl
 The Saint (episode "The Counterfeit Countess", 1967) – Mireille / Joan Vendel
 The Champions (TV series, 1968–69) – Sharron Macready
 Call My Bluff as herself, 4 episodes (1969-1975)
 Randall and Hopkirk (Deceased) (episode "Whoever Heard of a Ghost Dying?", 1969) – Carol Latimer
 Codename (1970) (TV series) – Diana Dalzell
 From a Bird's Eye View (episode "Sicillian Affair", 1970) – Lisa Vespucci
 The Starlost (TV series, 1973), episode 11 "The Astrometrics"
 The Aphrodite Inheritance (miniseries, 1979) – Helene
 Magnolia Blossom by Agatha Christie, 1982 - Clare Hamilton
 Legend of the Champions (TV, 1983) – Sharron Macready
 Absolutely Fabulous (episode "Fat", 1992) – Penny Caspar-Morse
 EastEnders (2008–2009) – Cynthia (final television appearance)

Radio
 Halloween Party by Agatha Christie, BBC radio 1993
 Five Little Pigs by Agatha Christie, BBC radio 1994
 Elephants Can Remember'' by Agatha Christie, dramatised by Michael Bakewell, BBC radio 2006

References

External links
Official Alexandra Bastedo Champions Animal Sanctuary site
Official website

Selected performances in Bristol University Theatre Archive
Obituary in The Independent by Marcus Williamson

1946 births
2014 deaths
20th-century English actresses
21st-century English actresses
Actresses from Sussex
Animal welfare workers
Keepers of animal sanctuaries
Deaths from cancer in England
English film actresses
English people of Canadian descent
English people of Dutch descent
English people of French descent
English people of German descent
English people of Italian descent
English people of Scottish descent
English people of Spanish descent
English soap opera actresses
English television actresses
People educated at Brighton and Hove High School
People from Hove
People from West Chiltington
20th-century British businesspeople